Rasulabad-e Olya (also Romanized as Rasūlābād-e ‘Olyā; also known as Tājābād, Tājābād-e ‘Olyā, and Tājīābād-e ‘Olyā) is a village in Abrumand Rural District, in the Central District of Bahar County, Hamadan Province, Iran. At the 2006 census, its population was 228, in 50 families.

References 

Populated places in Bahar County